The Institute of Public Affairs of the University of Chile is a multidisciplinary institute, created on 13 November 2001, after three University of Chile units were merged: the Centre of Analysis of Public Politics, the Institute of Political Science, and the School of Government, Public Management and Political Science.

In addition to being a centre for Chilean public policy research, the Institute contains an undergraduate program in Public Administration (through the School of Government and Public Management) and two graduate programs: a Master's in Political Science, and a Master's in Government and Public Management.

The Institute's faculty offices and graduate school are located in the Santa Lucia neighborhood of downtown Santiago, and its School of Government and Public Management is located in the Brasil neighborhood, in a building purchased from the now-defunct ARCIS University.

References

External links
 Institute of Public Affairs 

Public administration schools
University of Chile
2001 establishments in Chile